Candelaria Lucía Herrera Rodríguez (born 28 January 1999 San Juan, Argentina) is an Argentine volleyball player who participated with the Argentina national team. She competed at the 2020 Summer Olympics.

Career 
She participated at the 2016 Women's Pan-American Volleyball Cup. She qualified for the 2020 Summer Olympics.

She played for Florida A&M University, and Iowa State University.

References 

Living people
1999 births
Argentine women's volleyball players
Olympic volleyball players of Argentina
Middle blockers
Argentine expatriate sportspeople in the United States
Florida A&M Lady Rattlers volleyball players
Iowa State Cyclones women's volleyball players
People from San Juan, Argentina
Volleyball players at the 2019 Pan American Games
Pan American Games medalists in volleyball
Pan American Games bronze medalists for Argentina
Medalists at the 2019 Pan American Games
Volleyball players at the 2020 Summer Olympics
Sportspeople from San Juan Province, Argentina
21st-century Argentine women